"Don't You Miss Me a Little Bit Baby" is a 1967 soul song originally recorded by Motown singer Jimmy Ruffin and released on the company's Soul subsidiary label.

Details
The track was written by Norman Whitfield and Barrett Strong, Motown's hit songwriting duo responsible for many of the company's late '60s and early '70s classics. The song was also co-written by lyricist Rodger Penzabene, who drew inspiration from his real-life heart break over learning that his wife had been unfaithful. Penzabene was also responsible for several similarly-themed hit songs for The Temptations, including "I Wish It Would Rain" and "I Could Never Love Another (After Loving You)", but, unable to handle the extreme pain and unable to leave his wife, committed suicide on New Year's Eve 1967.

Jimmy Ruffin recorded the song in May 1967, and it was released as a single in June the same year. It became a minor hit on the US Pop Charts, reaching No. 68, and made the Top 30 on the R&B Charts, peaking at No. 27. It was also released as a single in Britain, by Tamla Motown, but failed to chart. Ruffin would, however, find considerably more success on the UK Charts, and would amass a total of 6 UK Top Ten hits over his career. His signature tune, "What Becomes of the Brokenhearted", made No. 8 in 1966, and performed even better upon its rerelease in 1974, reaching No. 4. "Don't You Miss Me a Little Bit Baby" was released as the B-side to "Brokenhearted" when it was reissued in 1974.

Covers

Fellow Motown singer Marvin Gaye recorded the song in September 1969. Gaye's version, more uptempo and in a funky psychedelic soul style, was included on his That's The Way Love Is album, released in January 1970. Marvin Gaye also recorded a version of Jimmy Ruffin's "Gonna Give Her All the Love I've Got" for the same album, and it was a modest hit of its own, making No. 67 and No. 26 on the US Pop and R&B Charts respectively. Gladys Knight & The Pips also recorded "Don't You Miss Me a Little Bit Baby", in early 1968. Their version was more in keeping with the original by Jimmy Ruffin and was released as a track on their Feelin' Bluesy album from the same year. Jamaican star Delroy Wilson also covered the song, under the title "Who Cares."

Personnel

Jimmy Ruffin version

Lead vocals by Jimmy Ruffin
Background vocals by The Originals and The Andantes
Instrumentation by The Funk Brothers

Marvin Gaye version
Lead vocals by Marvin Gaye
Instrumentation by The Funk Brothers

Gladys Knight and The Pips version
 Lead vocals by Gladys Knight
 Background vocals by Merald "Bubba" Knight, Edward Patten, and William Guest
 Instrumentation by The Funk Brothers

Delroy Wilson version 
 Lead vocals by Delroy Wilson

References

1967 songs
1967 singles
1968 songs
1969 songs
Marvin Gaye songs
Jimmy Ruffin songs
Gladys Knight & the Pips songs
Soul songs
Motown singles
Songs written by Barrett Strong
Songs written by Norman Whitfield
Songs written by Rodger Penzabene
Song recordings produced by Norman Whitfield